Manjushree Technopack Limited is India's largest rigid plastic packaging company. MTL has a large converting capacity of over 1,75,000 MT of PET, HDPE, PP grade plastics in bottles, containers, and PET preforms per annum, with an estimated revenue of Rs.1,100 billion. It is based in Bangalore.

History 

Manjushree was founded by Vimal Kedia and Surendra Kedia in 1983. In 2018, Advent International acquired 77% stake of the company. Backed by a strong managing team the company today caters to rigid packaging requirements of the top 500 MNCs across the globe. The industries they serve are - FMCG industry verticals ranging from dairy to liquor, food products, agrochemicals, pharma, home care, and personal care. 
Manjushree has nine manufacturing plants located in Amritsar, Baddi, Pantnagar, Guwahati, Manesar, Silvassa and two plants in Karnataka. In June 2020, they commissioned their first recycling plant in Bidadi, Karnataka.

Latest Update 

Manjushree recently acquired the B2B business of Pearl Polymers Ltd., through a Business Transfer Agreement. The deal is subject to customary approvals from regulatory authorities in India and is expected to close once regulatory approvals are in place. Pearl Polymers is a leading container player with a pan India footprint and marquee clientele in FMCG, Pharma, Liquor segments, and many more. On completion of this transfer, Manjushree will acquire four of Pearl Polymers manufacturing units.

Services 

Manjushree offers comprehensive packaging services, starting from designing sustainable packaging to offering a quick time-to-market. They offer a wide range of catalog design selections in bottles and containers. Manjushree also has an extensive range of promotional packaging designs with a white labeling option.

References

External links 
  

Indian brands
Indian companies established in 1983
Companies based in Bangalore
1983 establishments in Karnataka
Packaging companies of India